Kan Ma Pha La is a 2020 Burmese drama film, directed by Pan Chi Soe Moe starring Min Maw Kun, Pyay Ti Oo, Moe Hay Ko, Soe Pyae Thazin, Aye Myat Thu and Zin Wine. The film, produced by Pwal Khin Film Production premiered Myanmar on January 2, 2020.

Cast
Pyay Ti Oo as Kan Kaung
Min Maw Kun as U Sein Maung
Moe Hay Ko as A Hmi
Soe Pyae Thazin as A Thant
Aye Myat Thu as Saw Hla
Zin Wine as U Nakee
Yan Kyaw as U Thant Sin
Thi Yati as Daw Phyu Nu
Soe Yan Aung as Sein Kyi Aung
Soe Thiha as Nyein Aung

References

2020 films
2020s Burmese-language films
Burmese drama films
Films shot in Myanmar
2020 drama films